Strumigenys liukueiensis is a species of ant endemic to Taiwan.

This ant is similar to Strumigenys solifontis but can be identified by the abundant hairs on the head and mesosoma. The only similarly hairy Strumigenys ant found in Taiwan is S. lichiaensis which is much smaller than S. liukueiensis.

References

Myrmicinae
Insects described in 1989
Endemic fauna of Taiwan
Hymenoptera of Asia
Insects of Taiwan